Claude Parent (26 February 1923 – 27 February 2016), born in Neuilly-sur-Seine, France, was a French architect.

Architect, polemicist and theoretician, Claude Parent was the first person in France to make a sharp epistemological break with modernism, beginning in the mid 1950s. Through articles, books, magnificent manifesto-drawings and built projects, his work has enabled us to rethink our understanding and evolve our grasp of space. From the Maison Drusch (1963) all the way to his project for the Musée du Prado (1995), he has sought to create discontinuity by shifting and tipping volumes and by fracturing of the plan. Essentially self-taught, he began his career with Ionel Schein, with whom he worked until 1955. He also participated in the Espace group, founded in 1951 by the artists André Bloc and Félix del Marle. The Architecture Principe group (1963–68) was born out of his encounter with Paul Virilio. As was the adventure of the oblique function, their innovation through the continuity of the inclined plane, which led to the construction of the l’Eglise Sainte-Bernadette-du-Banlay in Nevers (1966).

After the 1968 split with Virilio, Claude Parent continued to experiment, develop and build the oblique function into his projects (Claude Parent's own house in Neuilly, painter Andrée Bellaguet's apartment) as well as in temporary installations in several Maisons de la Culture (Culture centers in France in the late 60s). In 1970, he curates and designs the French Pavilion at the 35th Venice Art Biennale, Italy, inviting artists such as Gérard Mannoni, Gilles Ehrmann, Samuel Buri; François Morellet, Andrée Bellaguet, Jean-Pierre Cousin and Charles Maussion. Claude Parent's space design (called "The Line of the Greatest Slope") is the first successful attempt to construct an oblique space. Imagined alone, but elaborated collectively, the French pavilion is considered by Parent as "a collective act [...] a creative action." With this event, Claude Parent transforms the viewer into works of art. This experiment becomes his working material and the reactions, positive as well as negative, will form the basis of the architect's study.

Parent also designed several superstores in “béton brut” or “raw concrete” in Ris Orangis (1969) and Sens (1970), among others. In 1974, a few months after the oil crisis, EDF (France's production and distribution power company), Parent, 47, is entrusted with the coordination of a group of architects including, among others Paul Andreu, Jean Willerval and Roger Taillibert. For the next 10 years he leads the group to redesign nuclear power plants and find ways to better integrate them in the landscape. Commissions from the public sector for the French Education Department, the Regional Council of Provence Alpes Côte d’Azur in Marseille (1991), the Charles de Gaulle airport exchange center (1995) and the French Pavilion facade at the Venice Biennale of Architecture (1996) are all expressions of his quest for disequilibrium, movement and fluidity in architecture. Demanding, critical, provocative and fiercely obstinate, Claude Parent has continuously proposed places of contradiction generating doubt and disquiet and excluding any sort of passiveness with regard to architecture.

Though destined for a career as an engineer in the field of aeronautics, Claude Parent enrolled in the École Nationale Supérieure des Beaux-Arts of Toulouse in 1943 in the architecture studio, and then in 1946 in the École Nationale Supérieure des Beaux-Arts of Paris. He left before obtaining his diploma in architecture, and later founded his own firm in 1956, but was only recognized by and admitted to the Order of Architects in 1966, based on his experience. An Academician, Claude Parent is a Commander of the French Legion of Honor, a Commander of Arts and Letters, Officer of the Palmes Académiques and a Commander of the National Order of Merit. Prizes stand as milestones marking his entire career: National Grand Prize of Architecture (1979), the silver medal of the Academy of Architecture, the medal of the Central Union of the Decorative Arts, the gold medal of the Society for the Encouragement of Progress and the medal of the U.I.A for his work in criticism. In 1994, Architecture critic and curator Fréderic Migayrou celebrates Claude Parent's essential contribution and unique place in post WWII architecture, and many leading architects such as Jean Nouvel, Frank Gehry, Thom Mayne, Zaha Hadid recognize him as both a precursor and an influence. In 2010, a retrospective exhibition at the Cité de l’Architecture et du Patrimoine was dedicated to this major figure in the history of 20th-century architecture.

Important built works 

 Villa André Bloc, Antibes, France (1959-1962)
Avicenna Foundation (formerly House of Iran, Cité internationale universitaire de Paris), with Mohsen Foroughi and Heydar Ghiai), Paris, France (1960-1968)
Drusch House, Versailles, France (1963-1965)
 Bordeaux-le-Pecq House, Bois-le-Roi, France (1963-1965)
 Sainte-Bernadette du Banlay Church (with Paul Virilio, Architecture Principe), Nevers, France (1963-1966)
Shopping Center in Sens, France (1967-1971)
Shopping Center in Ris-Orangis, France (1967-1971)
 French pavillon for the 35th Venice Biennale, Italy (1970)
 Septen, building for studies of thermal and nuclear projects, Villeurbanne, France (1984)
Vincent d'Indy High School, Paris, France (1985-1987)
Silvia Monfort Theater, Paris, France (1984-1991)
L'Aeronef, Roissypôle exchange center, Charles de Gaulle Airport, Roissy, France (1989-1996)
Myslbek office building, Prague, Czech Republic (1992-1996)
Lillebonne City Hall, France (1993-1998)
French pavillon facade for the Venice Biennale, Italy (1996)
Hill of Art pavillon for the Wolfson Gallery at the Tate Liverpool, UK (2014)

Important publications 

Architecture Principe, by Claude Parent and Paul Virilio (1966 & 1996)
The Function of the Oblique: The Architecture of Claude Parent and Paul Virilio from 1963-1969 (2004)
Claude Parent : l'œuvre construite, l'œuvre graphique (2010)
Claude Parent: Demain, La Terre... (2010)
Yves Klein & Claude Parent: The Memorial, an Architectural Project (2013)
Claude Parent - Visionary Architect (2019)

Awards and decorations 
Awards

Grand prix national de l’architecture (1979)
Silver medal of l’Académie d’Architecture
Medal of l’Union des Arts Décoratifs
Gold medal of the Société d’Encouragement au Progrès
Medal of International Union of Architects

Decorations
Commander of the National Order of Merit (France)
Commander of l'Ordre des Arts et des Lettres
Commander of the Legion of Honour
Officer of l'Ordre des Palmes Académiques
Member of the Académie des Beaux-Arts (Architecture) (2005)

References 

1923 births
2016 deaths
20th-century French architects
21st-century French architects
Commandeurs of the Légion d'honneur
Commandeurs of the Ordre des Arts et des Lettres
École des Beaux-Arts alumni
People from Neuilly-sur-Seine
Members of the Académie d'architecture